Linda Myers may refer to:

 Linda K. Myers (born 1940), American politician in Vermont
 Linda Myers (archer) (born 1947), American archer